(1818–1886) was a Japanese samurai of the Edo period. A senior retainer of the Sendai domain. Kuninori was the twelfth Katakura Kojūrō, and saw action under Sendai command in the Boshin War. During the war, his castle of Shiroishi became the command post for Sendai forces, as well as the administrative center of the Ouetsu Reppan Domei. His father was Katakura Munekage. His wife was Aihime, Date Munehira's daughter and his son was Katakura Kagenori.

External links
Katakura family tree (in Japanese)
Short biographical notes on Katakura Kuninori (in Japanese)

Meiji Restoration
Samurai
1818 births
1886 deaths
People of the Boshin War
Karō
Katakura clan
People from Sendai Domain